Makarovka is a rural locality (a selo) in Alyoshnikovskoye Rural Settlement, Zhirnovsky District, Volgograd Oblast, Russia. The population was 22 as of 2010.

Geography 
Makarovka is located in forest steppe of Volga Upland, 48 km southeast of Zhirnovsk (the district's administrative centre) by road. Podchinny is the nearest rural locality.

References 

Rural localities in Zhirnovsky District